Lionsgate Films (formerly known as Cinépix Film Properties) is a Canadian-American film production and film distribution studio, headquartered in Santa Monica and founded in Canada, and is the flagship division of Lionsgate Entertainment. It is the largest and most successful mini-major film studio in North America. It focuses on foreign and independent films and has distributed various commercially successful film franchises, including The Hunger Games, Rambo, Divergent, The Punisher, John Wick, Saw, Madea, Blair Witch, Now You See Me, Hostel, The Expendables, Sinister, The Twilight Saga and Step Up.

History

Cinépix
Cinépix was founded by John Dunning and Andre Link in 1962. Cinépix, based in Montreal, was a Canadian independent motion picture company that released English- and French-language films in Canada and the United States.

Initially a distribution company, Cinépix's first production was the 1969 erotic drama Valérie, which earned $1 million at the box office. Cinépix produced early work by David Cronenberg (Shivers) and Ivan Reitman (Meatballs). The company also distributed art-house films including the grunge rock documentary Hype, Vincent Gallo's Buffalo '66, and SICK: The Life & Death of Bob Flanagan, Supermasochist.

From 1989 to 1994, Cinépix was partners with Famous Players in C/FP Distribution, which was renamed Cinépix Film Properties (C/FP). In 1994, Cinépix bought Famous Players' stake in the organization.

By 1997, Cinépix had a New York-based U.S. distribution arm and owned 56 percent of Ciné-Groupe, an animated film production company.

Lionsgate Films
Lions Gate Entertainment Corporation (LGEC) was formed in 1997 by Frank Giustra, a banker. LGEC purchased Cinépix and kept its leadership. Cinépix was renamed Lions Gate Films on January 13, 1998. LGEC also purchased the Vancouver-based North Shore Studios, which became Lions Gate Studios. In June 1998, LGE purchased International Movie Group, whose film library included Jean-Claude Van Damme's Kickboxer.

Its first major box office success was American Psycho in 2000, which began a trend of producing and distributing films too controversial for the major film studios. Other notable films included Affliction (1998), Gods and Monsters (1998), Dogma (1999), O (2001), Cube 2: Hypercube (2002), Open Water (2003), Saw (2004), The Punisher (2004)  and the Michael Moore documentary Fahrenheit 9/11 (2004), which had been the studio's highest-grossing film until the release of The Hunger Games in 2012.

Giustra left the firm in 2000. That same year, Jon Feltheimer became CEO and Michael Burns became vice chairman. They decided to focus on the profits of videos and DVDs and began buying struggling firms that controlled large libraries. The two most notable acquisitions were Trimark Holdings (650 titles) in 2000 and Artisan Entertainment in 2003. The Trimark purchase also included CinemaNow, a broadband streaming website, where Lionsgate could feature its own movies. These two purchases along with others gave Lions Gate a large DVD (and later Blu-Ray) library, which includes Total Recall, Reservoir Dogs, Terminator 2: Judgment Day, Young Guns, Dirty Dancing and Apocalypse Now, in some cases via output deals with StudioCanal, American Zoetrope, and Miramax (most of them the result of prior licensing deals with Lions Gate's home video predecessor Artisan).

Lions Gate occasionally co-produces films with major studios. For example, Lions Gate teamed with Miramax Films for the 2004 sequel Dirty Dancing: Havana Nights and with Paramount Pictures for 2002's Narc and 2004's The Prince & Me which was given a studio credit. Lions Gate was also a silent partner in 20th Century Fox's 2004 sci-fi film The Day After Tomorrow. Also in 2004, Lions Gate joined forces with United Artists in producing Hotel Rwanda.

On August 1, 2005, Lions Gate Entertainment Corp acquired the entire library of Modern Entertainment. On October 17, 2005, Lionsgate acquired Redbus Film Distribution for $35 million and became Lionsgate UK on February 23, 2006. Following this, Zygi Kamasa, who co-founded Redbus with Simon Franks, became CEO of Lionsgate UK and Europe.

In 2007, Joe Drake became Lionsgate's co-COO and motion picture group president. Lionsgate cut back its annual production by four in February 2009.

The Lionsgate film The Hunger Games grossed $68.3 million when it premiered at the U.S. box office on March 23, 2012. At the time, it was the best opening day ever for a non-sequel and the fifth highest of all time. Of that total, $19.7 million was earned via Thursday midnight screenings. In its first weekend, The Hunger Games grossed $152.5 million, making it Lionsgate's highest-grossing film after just three days.

On January 13, 2012, Lions Gate Entertainment Corp acquired Summit Entertainment, the studio behind the Twilight and Step Up series for $412.5 million. On May 3, 2012, Lionsgate Films made an agreement with CodeBlack Enterprises' CEO Jeff Clanagan to create CodeBlack Films, based at Lionsgate. Drake left in 2012 to found Good Universe.

On January 16, 2013, Lionsgate announced a low-budget film division to be led by John Sacchi. The division would release films under $2.5 million. Sacchi recently looked to acquire such films as Rock Bottom Creek (2012) and other independently made films as well.

On November 22, 2013, Lions Gate released The Hunger Games: Catching Fire. In its opening weekend, the movie grossed $158 million at the US box office, surpassing its predecessor, which generated $150 million in its opening weekend. The film had a budget of $130 million, breaking even soon after its opening, and making it profitable. Critics highly praised the film; it received a Rotten Tomatoes rating of 89% "certified fresh". The third Hunger Games film, Mockingjay- Part 1, was released in 2014. The final film, Mockingjay - Part 2, was released in 2015.

On April 1, 2015, according to Deadline, Lions Gate announced it has created its new label, Lionsgate Premiere. This new label will handle up to 15 releases a year, targeting young audiences at theaters and digital outlets. The new label, part of the company's diversification effort, will incorporate Lionsgate and Summit Entertainment titles and then specialize in "innovative multiplatform and other release strategies" to reach "affinity audiences with branded content and targeted marketing." Marketing and Research SVP Jean McDowell will handle marketing, with distribution to be run by Adam Sorensen, who currently manages Western Sales.

On May 2, 2016, according to Deadline Hollywood, Lions Gate announced it has teaming with eight international companies to launch the GlobalGate Entertainment consortium. GlobalGate will produce and distribute local-language films in markets around the world. Lionsgate said Monday it has partnered with international entertainment executives Paul Presburger, William Pfeiffer and Clifford Werber to launch GlobalGate.

Drake returned in October 2017 as Liongate's film group chairman. The company laid off staff for theatrical marketing and publicity in its New York office, and moved to end its participation as a partner in CodeBlack Films in January 2019. The cut backs were due to the failures of Robin Hood, and the comedy The Spy Who Dumped Me. In June 2019, Hulu and FX picked up show rights to Lionsgate films released in 2020 and 2021.

Film library

Film series

Highest-grossing films

References

External links

Official UK website

Film production companies of the United States
Lionsgate subsidiaries
Companies based in Santa Monica, California
Entertainment companies based in California
Entertainment companies established in 1962
1962 establishments in Canada
1962 establishments in Quebec